Munib Rashid al-Masri, also known as the "Duke of Nablus", and "the Godfather"(b. 1934), is a Palestinian industrialist, philanthropist, and patriarch of the al-Masri family.

Relatives of his include his cousin, Arab Bank and Paltel chairman Sabih al-Masri, and nephews, developer Bashar Masri, and Jordanian former prime minister Taher al-Masri.

One of Yasser Arafat's closest friends and supporters, al-Masri has served as a minister in the cabinet of Jordan, and has on multiple occasions declined both the presidency and the prime ministership of Palestine.

Personal life
al-Masri was born in Nablus in 1934. He attended the an-Najah National University and graduated from the University of Texas in the United States. He was involved in establishing the al-Quds University.

His wealth is rooted in the oil and gas business, but much of his investments fall under the Edgo Group, his holding company which operates in contracting, industrial development, trading, distribution and representation, project development, operation and maintenance.

Between 1998 and 2000 he built a house which he named Beit Falasteen or "House of Palestine", near Nablus, inspired by Andrea Palladio's Villa Capra "La Rotonda".

He is married to Angela Masri and they have four sons, Rabih, Mazen, Omar and Leith, and two daughters Mai Masri and Dina.

Peace efforts
Al-Masri has stated that he has been working for the last 40 years to bring about a long lasting peace between Palestinians and Israelis. He would like to see an independent Palestine living in peace and harmony with Israel.

In May 2013, al-Masri and high-level Israeli high-tech entrepreneur Yossi Vardi unveiled the Breaking the Impasse (BTI) Initiative at the World Economic Forum held at the Dead Sea. At the launch, al-Masri stated, "It’s not for us to iron out the details. We are worried by the status quo. We want to change the status quo… Now the Israeli and Palestinian side [of the initiative] are very honest in their appeal: They want to break the impasse… They want the two sides to negotiate… to push all the parties to engage in real negotiations."

The BTI Forum was hosted by King Abdullah of Jordan and attended by John Kerry, Shimon Peres and Mahmoud Abbas. Breaking the Impasse initiatives goal is to encourage and support political leaders to work towards a two-state solution. al-Masri has stated that he will keep working towards achieving peace through the 2002 Arab Peace Initiative, which, like the Fez Initiative, offers Israel full recognition and normal relations with the Arabs in the context of comprehensive peace.

References

External links

Prime Ministry of Jordan website

1934 births
Palestinian businesspeople
People from Nablus
Palestinian inventors
Palestinian chief executives
Palestinian investors
Palestinian philanthropists
Palestinian company founders
American University of Beirut trustees
Living people
Government ministers of Jordan
Public works ministers of Jordan
University of Texas at Austin alumni
An-Najah National University alumni